463 West Street is a 13-building complex located on the block between West Street, Washington Street, Bank Street, and Bethune Street in Manhattan, New York. It was originally the home of Bell Telephone Laboratories between 1898 and 1966. For a time, it was the largest industrial research center in the United States. It was listed on the National Register of Historic Places and further designated as a National Historic Landmark, as Bell Telephone Laboratories.

Many early technological inventions were developed here including automatic telephone panel and crossbar switches, the first experimental talking movies (1923), black-and-white and color TV, video telephones, radar, the vacuum tube, the transistor, medical equipment, the development of the phonograph record and the first commercial broadcasts, including the first broadcast of a baseball game and the New York Philharmonic with Arturo Toscanini conducting. It also served as the headquarters for the company from 1925 to the early 1960s, after which the headquarters moved to Murray Hill, New Jersey.

The site was also the home for part of the Manhattan Project during World War II.

After two years of renovations by Richard Meier, the building was reopened in 1970 as Westbeth Artists Community for low- to middle-income artists. In addition to affordable artist housing, the complex contains a theatre, an art gallery, and a synagogue.

It was declared a National Historic Landmark in 1975. The complex was listed a second time on the National Register in 2009, for its high-profile and successful example of adaptive reuse of the property.

The southern viaduct section of the West Side Line railroad passed underneath the building at first floor level. This segment remains in place but is now isolated from the rest of the former railroad viaduct, which is now the High Line elevated park.

References 

Industrial buildings completed in 1898
Buildings and structures on the National Register of Historic Places in Manhattan
Telecommunications buildings on the National Register of Historic Places
National Historic Landmarks in Manhattan
West Village
Industrial buildings and structures on the National Register of Historic Places in New York City
West Side Highway
Bell Labs
AT&T buildings